Cytohesin-1 formerly known as Pleckstrin homology, Sec7 and coiled/coil domains 1 (PSCD1) is a protein that in humans is encoded by the CYTH1 gene.

Function 

Cytohesin-1 (CYTH1) is a member of the cytohesin family. Members of this family have identical structural organization that consists of an N-terminal coiled-coil motif, a central Sec7 domain, and a C-terminal pleckstrin homology (PH) domain. The coiled-coil motif is involved in homodimerization, the Sec7 domain contains guanine-nucleotide exchange protein (GEP) activity, and the PH domain interacts with phospholipids and is responsible for association of CYTHs with membranes. Members of this family appear to mediate the regulation of protein sorting and membrane trafficking. The CYTH1 is highly expressed in natural killer and peripheral T cells, and regulates the adhesiveness of integrins at the plasma membrane of lymphocytes. CYTH1 protein is 83% homologous to CYTH2.

Interactions 

CYTH1 has been shown to interact with:
 ARFRP1,
 CD18, and
 TRIM23.

References

Further reading